Botryophora is a genus of plant of the family Euphorbiaceae first described as a genus in 1888. It contains only one known species, Botryophora geniculata, native to Thailand, Myanmar, Malaysia, Borneo, Sumatra, and Java.

References

Pycnocomeae
Monotypic Euphorbiaceae genera
Flora of Indo-China
Flora of Malesia
Taxa named by Joseph Dalton Hooker